is an international football referee from Japan. She was an official at the 2019 FIFA Women's World Cup in France. She also refereed at the 2020 Summer Olympics, in the match between the United States and Sweden. In 2022 she was one of the three women referees selected to officiate at the 2022 FIFA World Cup in Qatar.For the first time, a female referee was elected for the FIFA World Cup. The number of people was 6 people.

Also during 2022, Yamashita became the first female referee to officiate a game in both the men's AFC Champions League and the J1 League, taking charge of Melbourne City's 2–1 win over Chunnam Dragons and FC Tokyo's 2–0 win over Kyoto Sanga respectively.She made her FIFA World Cup debut as Fourth Official in the Group F match against Belgium against Canada, and was the number Fourth Official in six games in this competition.

References

Living people
1986 births
Japanese football referees
FIFA Women's World Cup referees
2022 FIFA World Cup referees
FIFA World Cup referees
Women association football referees